The 2010–2011 Jordanian Pro League (known as the Al-Manaseer Jordanian Pro League, named after Ziad AL-Manaseer Companies Group for sponsorship reasons) was the 59th season of the top-flight football in Jordan.Al-Faisaly are the defending champions. Ittihad Al-Ramtha and Al-Karmel were relegated to the second level of Jordan football after ending the 2009–10 season in the bottom two places. Promoted from the second level were Al-Ahli (Amman) and Manshia Bani Hassan.The championship was won by Al-Wehdat, while Al-Ahli and Al-Hussein were relegated. A total of 12 teams participated.

Teams

Map

Managerial changes

Pre-season

Final league table

Relegation Playoffs

 Kfarsoum defeated Al-Hussein (Irbid) 3–1 in the end of season relegation playoff to relegate Al-Hussein (Irbid).

References

Jordanian Pro League seasons
1
Jor